This is a comprehensive listing of official releases by J Álvarez, a Puerto Rican reggaeton artist.

Albums

Studio albums

Singles

References

Discographies of Puerto Rican artists
Reggaeton discographies